The name Pisgah may refer to:

Mount Pisgah (Bible)

Places

In the United States

Communities
Pisgah, Alabama, a town
Pisgah, Georgia, an unincorporated community
Pisgah, Iowa, a city
Pisgah, Illinois, an unincorporated community
Pisgah, Kentucky, an unincorporated community
Pisgah, Maryland, an unincorporated community
Pisgah, Mississippi, an unincorporated community
Pisgah, Missouri, an unincorporated community
Pisgah, North Carolina, an unincorporated community
Pisgah, Ohio, an unincorporated community
Pisgah, Texas, a ghost town
Pisgah, West Virginia, an unincorporated community

Other
Pisgah Crater, Mohave Desert, California
Pisgah Branch, a stream in Missouri
Pisgah State Park, New Hampshire
Pisgah National Forest, North Carolina
Pisgah Mountain, Pennsylvania

In Wales
Pisgah, Ceredigion, a small village

Churches
Pisgah United Methodist Church, Tallahassee, Florida, on the National Register of Historic Places
Pisgah United Methodist Church and Cemetery, Pisgah, Tennessee, on the National Register of Historic Places
Pisgah Christian Church, Ohio, on the National Register of Historic Places

Schools
Pisgah High School (Mississippi)
Pisgah High School (North Carolina)

Other uses
Pisgah Astronomical Research Institute, North Carolina

See also

Mount Pisgah (disambiguation)
Pisgah Grande, a defunct religious community in Las Llajas Canyon, California
Pisgah Home Historic District, a historic district in Los Angeles, California